The 1900 Nashville Garnet and Blue football team represented the University of Nashville during the 1900 Southern Intercollegiate Athletic Association football season. The team was led by first-year head coach Charley Moran. Nashville lost to Auburn on a wet and heavy field.

Schedule

References

Nashville
Nashville Garnet and Blue football seasons
Nashville Garnet and Blue football